Kabiguru Nobel Centenary Training College is an Indian training college run by the Rural Improvement Trust.

See also

References

External links 

University of Kalyani
University Grants Commission
National Assessment and Accreditation Council

Universities and colleges in Murshidabad district
2015 establishments in West Bengal
Educational institutions established in 2015